Italian tomato pie is an Italian-American and Italian-Canadian baked good consisting of a thick, porous, focaccia-like dough covered with tomato sauce. It may be sprinkled with romano cheese or oregano. It is not usually served straight from the oven, but allowed to cool and then consumed at room temperature or reheated. Like Sicilian pizza, tomato pie is baked in a large rectangular pan and usually served in square slices, although in Rhode Island it is cut into rectangular strips like pizza al taglio. Tomato pie descends from and resembles the Italian sfincione, although it is not the same dish; for instance, sfincione may have toppings, is usually served hot, and has a crust more like brioche than focaccia.

A 1903 article in the New-York Tribune on the food of Italian-Americans described an early version of tomato pie. Tomato pie has been sold by Iannelli's Bakery in Philadelphia since 1910. In Utica, New York, the family that would later found O'Scugnizzo's Pizzeria in 1914 sold tomato pies from their basement for several years prior, starting in 1910.

Regional names 

 Utica: tomato pie
 Philadelphia: church pie, gravy pie (as in "Italian gravy", i.e. tomato sauce) 
 Rhode Island: bakery pizza, party pizza, pizza strips, red bread, strip pizza, red strips 
 Montreal: tomato pizza, cold pizza, pizza bread  
 Hamilton, Ontario: Roma pizza (after the name of a bakery), bread pizza, slab pizza

Gallery

See also

 List of tomato dishes
 Sicilian pizza
 Southern tomato pie
 Trenton tomato pie

References

Italian-American cuisine
Italian-American culture in New York (state)
Italian-American culture in Philadelphia
Italian-American culture in Rhode Island
Italian-Canadian culture
Pizza styles
Tomato dishes